St. Thomas High School (French: École secondaire St. Thomas) is an English-language public high school in the municipality of Pointe-Claire, in Quebec, Canada. Founded in 1960, it was originally a Roman Catholic foundation, and it is a member of the International Baccalaureate Organization's certified Middle Years Programme. The school is the second-largest high school operated by the Lester B. Pearson School Board, after John Rennie High School, which is also located in Pointe-Claire. For the 2008 school year, St. Thomas High School ranked 1 out of all 466 schools in the province.

The present population is 1,355 students and includes students from thirty-nine Elementary Schools. St. Thomas has a Code of Conduct developed collaboratively by staff, and parents, which ensures a student's right to be educated in a caring, respectful environment. St. Thomas has an Honour Society in order to grant recognition to their top students.

The Lester B. Pearson School Board has decided to move St. Thomas High into Lindsay Place High School in July 2021, where Lindsay Place will then cease to exist. The board's plan is to mesh the student populations from both high schools, with as little student displacement as possible.

Notable alumni
 Paul Brousseau, drafted by the Quebec Nordiques
 Dr. Joe Cassidy, head of St Chad's College, Durham, England
 Jeremy Davies, drafted by the Nashville Predators
 Linda Griffiths, actress and playwright
 Ross Hull, Canadian actor
 Brittany Kennell, Canadian country music artist and former contestant on The Voice season 10
 Terence McKenna, Canadian film producer, journalist
 Casey McKinnon, actress
 Autumn Phillips (née Kelly), the former wife of Peter Phillips
 Brandon Reid, former NHL player
 Michael Soles, former CFL player
 Peter Szmidt, swimmer
 Larry Tittley, former star Canadian Football League player
 Joe Veleno, drafted by the Detroit Red Wings

References

High schools in Montreal
International Baccalaureate schools in Quebec
English-language schools in Quebec
Education in Pointe-Claire
Lester B. Pearson School Board
Buildings and structures in Pointe-Claire
Educational institutions established in 1960
1960 establishments in Quebec